Buras or Burås is a surname. Notable people with the surname include:

 Andrzej Buras (born 1946), Polish physicist
 Robert Burås (1975–2007), Norwegian musician
 Krzysztof Buras (born 1980), Polish bridge player

See also